Boguslawski, Bogusławski, or Boguslawsky may refer to:

 Bogusławski (surname)
 Boguslawsky (crater), a crater named after Palm von Boguslawski
 Boguslavsky Triple-Deckers

See also
 Bogusław (disambiguation)
 Bohuslav